Jeffrey T. Plale (May 31, 1968 – July 2, 2022) was an American politician and stockbroker. Plale served as the Wisconsin Railroad Commissioner.  Earlier in his career he represented South Milwaukee in the Wisconsin State Senate (2003–2011) and Wisconsin State Assembly (1996–2003).

Background and career
Born in South Milwaukee in 1968, Plale graduated from South Milwaukee High School. He worked as a stockbroker at Strong Capital Management from 1988 to 1996. He earned a B.A. in communications and public relations from Marquette University in 1990, and an M.A. in the same field in 1992. He was a member of the American Legislative Exchange Council (ALEC) when he was a legislator. Plale was a Catholic. He and his former wife had two children. He was a member of the Ancient Order of Hibernians.

Public office 
In 1992, he was elected as an alderman for South Milwaukee. He was first elected to the 21st District of the Assembly (South Milwaukee, Oak Creek and a small portion of Cudahy) in a March 1996 special election, with 6758 votes to 5609 for Republican Mike McCarrier; and was reelected in November 1996 with 14,020 votes to 6544 for Republican Arden Degner. He was re-elected through 2002, and resigned in May 2003 after being elected to the Senate in an April 2003 special election, and was succeeded in the Assembly by Republican Mark Honadel.

He was elected to the Senate seat held by Democrat Richard Grobschmidt until Grobschmidt's resignation to take a position as Assistant Superintendent of Public Instruction under Governor-elect Jim Doyle. Plale won a three-way Democratic primary, and a general election in which he polled 5282 votes to 2199 for Green Jim Carpenter (the Republicans did not contest the seat).  He won re-election in 2006 (after shaking off opposition in his primary) with 41,502 votes to 21,104 for Republican Dimity Grabowski and 3,564 for Green Claude VanderVeen (whose showing was the best of any Green candidate for Wisconsin Senate that year).

He lost his 2010 bid for re-nomination on September 14, 2010 when he was defeated in the Wisconsin Democratic primary election by Chris Larson, a member of the Milwaukee County Board of Supervisors, who contended that Plale was too conservative. Plale lost by 5,148 (39.3%) to 7,962 (60.7%) for Larson. Larson subsequently won the Senate race, in an election that saw four Democratic seats fall to Republicans.

During the lame duck legislative session after the election, Plale was one of two defeated Democratic state senators who voted against renewing contracts with state employee unions. After the vote, Plale was appointed administrator of state facilities in January, and later as Wisconsin Railroad Commissioner, by Governor Scott Walker, also a Republican.

References

External links

7th Senate District, Senator Plale in the Wisconsin Blue Book (2005–2006)

1968 births
2022 deaths
People from South Milwaukee, Wisconsin
Businesspeople from Wisconsin
Marquette University alumni
Democratic Party members of the Wisconsin State Assembly
Wisconsin city council members
Democratic Party Wisconsin state senators
Stockbrokers
21st-century American politicians
Catholics from Wisconsin